Mircea cel Bătrân National College may refer to one of two educational institutions in Romania:

Mircea cel Bătrân National College (Constanța)
Mircea cel Bătrân National College (Râmnicu Vâlcea)